Broad Avenue Historic District is a national historic district located at Altoona, Blair County, Pennsylvania.  The district includes 140 contributing buildings in a residential area of Altoona.  The buildings were primarily built between 1880 and 1927, and reflect a number of popular architectural styles including Colonial Revival and Italianate.  The area was developed as an early streetcar-oriented development in Altoona. Non-residential buildings include the Broad Avenue Presbyterian Church (c. 1895) and Broad Avenue United Methodist Church (1927).

It was added to the National Register of Historic Places in 2002.

References

Italianate architecture in Pennsylvania
Colonial Revival architecture in Pennsylvania
Historic districts in Blair County, Pennsylvania
Historic districts on the National Register of Historic Places in Pennsylvania
National Register of Historic Places in Blair County, Pennsylvania